Titchmarsh may refer to:

Titchmarsh, Northamptonshire, a village in England
Alan Titchmarsh (born 1949), English celebrity gardener, writer and broadcaster
The Alan Titchmarsh Show
Charles Titchmarsh (1881–1930), English cricketer
Edward Charles Titchmarsh (1899–1963), English mathematician
Titchmarsh theorem (disambiguation)
Titchmarsh convolution theorem
Brun–Titchmarsh theorem
Valentine Titchmarsh (1853–1907), English cricketer and cricket umpire